Harry Ames (January 14, 1896 – December 14, 1973) was a lumberman and political figure in New Brunswick, Canada.

Biography
He represented York County in the Legislative Assembly of New Brunswick from 1952 to his death in 1973 as a Progressive Conservative member.

He was born in Redditch, England, the son of Arthur Ames. He was educated in England and then, after coming to Canada in 1905, at Scotch Settlement. In 1924, he married Annie May Wilson (1901–1984).

References 

1896 births
1973 deaths
Businesspeople from New Brunswick
Businesspeople in timber
Progressive Conservative Party of New Brunswick MLAs
People from York County, New Brunswick
People from Redditch